Chris Lewis (born 12 June 1992) is a professional rugby league footballer who plays as a  forward for the Melbourne Storm in the National Rugby League.

Early life
Lewis played his junior rugby league for Ashford Roosters before being signed by Illawarra Steelers.

Playing career
Lewis with unsuccessful attempts of making first grade went onto play park footy for Shellharbour Sharks, Thirroul Butchers and Helensburgh Tigers.

In 2016, he was part of the Illawarra Cutters team that won the NSW Intrust Cup premiership, while completing his teaching degree at University of Wollongong.

From 2017-19 he went onto play in the Queensland Cup for the Sunshine Coast Falcons. While playing there he worked as a teacher at Caloundra State High School. He was named the Queensland Cup second rower of the year in 2019, earning a development contract with Melbourne Storm at the end of 2019.

2020
Round 4 of the 2020 NRL season, Lewis made his NRL debut for the Melbourne Storm against South Sydney. He had his Melbourne jersey (cap number 202) presented to him by former Melbourne player Ryan Hoffman. Lewis would make a handful of appearances for Melbourne in 2020, as he transitioned to full time sport after putting his teaching career on hiatus.

2021
Lewis would play 20 games for Melbourne during the 2021 season, as the club won the J. J. Giltinan Shield as minor premiers.

Controversy
In September 2021, a video was leaked to the media which showed Lewis along with Melbourne teammates Cameron Munster and Brandon Smith partying whilst Smith was taking an illicit substance which was alleged to be cocaine.

On 5 October 2021, Lewis was handed a $10,000 suspended fine and a one match suspension.

References

External links
Melbourne Storm profile

1992 births
Living people
Australian rugby league players
Rugby league players from New South Wales
Rugby league second-rows
Melbourne Storm players
Sunshine Coast Falcons players